Yaroshenko (Ukrainian: Ярошенко, also spelled Yarochenko or Iarochenko) is a Ukrainian last name. It is derived from the Ukrainian first name Yarosh.

People 
 Fedir Yaroshenko (born 1949), Ukrainian economist and politician
 Nikolay Yaroshenko (born 1986), Russian triathlete
 Dmitri Yaroshenko (born 1976), Russian biathlete
 Igor Yaroshenko (born 1967), Soviet–Ukrainian ice dancer
 Kostyantyn Yaroshenko (born 1986), Ukrainian footballer
 Nikolai Yaroshenko (1846–1898), Ukrainian painter
 Semen Yaroshenko (1846–1917), mathematician and mayor of Odessa
 Sergey Yaroshenko (born 1977), Ukrainian tennis player
 Valery Yaroshenko (born 1997), Russian footballer
 Yuriy Yaroshenko (born 1961), Soviet-Ukrainian footballer, father of Kostyantyn

See also
 
Yeroshenko

Ukrainian-language surnames